"Somethin' Hot" is a single by the band The Afghan Whigs. It appears on their 1998 album 1965.

Track listing
 "Somethin' Hot"
 "Somethin' Hot (12″ Remix)"
 "Miss World"
 "Papa was a Rascal"

External links
Single track listing on the Summer's Kiss website

1998 singles